Spathelia glabrescens is a species of plant in the family Rutaceae. It is endemic to Jamaica.

References

Flora of Jamaica
glabrescens
Near threatened plants
Endemic flora of Jamaica
Taxonomy articles created by Polbot